Apterona helicoidella (snailcase bagworm) is a moth of the Psychidae family. It is widely distributed in Europe, from Portugal through most of central Europe and the Alps, up to the Ural. It is also found on the Balkan and in Turkey. It was introduced in the United States by accident during the 1940s. It is now found in many mid-Atlantic states, including Pennsylvania, and has also been reported in the Pacific coastal states, as well as Colorado, Michigan, Nevada, Utah and Idaho. It has been collected in Ontario as well (Royal Ontario Museum Collection).

In southern Europe a subspecies with two sexes exists with small males that have light grey wings. This subspecies is called Apterona helicoidella crenulella.
North of the Alps the species is parthenogenetic and is called Apterona helicoidella helicoidella. Only females are present in this subspecies. They form a case that looks like a small snail. The females grow within the case, becoming adults in the late summer.  Unlike most bagworms, the case is constructed of soil particles and feces instead of leaves and twigs. The snailcase bagworm begins constructing its case at birth and remains inside for the rest of its life. This subspecies is unusual in that it is parthenogenetic; all individuals are females, and they reproduce without mating. Each female produces one to two dozen eggs, which are deposited within the case.

The case of a snailcase bagworm, not surprisingly, resembles a small snail about 4 mm in diameter with coloration similar to the soil. The larvae are greenish or reddish gray with a black head that protrudes from the case to feed.

Though the snailcase bagworm doesn't cause the damage of related species such as the evergreen bagworm, they are a nuisance to humans by attaching to the sides of homes and buildings.  Once the larvae are full-grown and moving to pupate, they cannot be controlled with insecticides.  The best way to keep them off the sides of buildings is by using temporary barriers like sticky tape or flanges.  They can be knocked off buildings with a strong spray of water before they attach.  After they are attached, removal is difficult.

They consume small areas of a leaf surface, rarely causing significant damage, though it has been found to feed on most vegetables, ornamentals, legumes, fruit and other trees, and many species of annual herbs. Reported food plants include Potentilla neumanniana, Erodium cicutarium, Teucrium, Artemisia vulgaris, Helianthemum nummularium and Alyssum montanum.

Sources
Penn State notes

References

External links
BioLib
Lepiforum.de

Psychidae
Moths of Europe
Moths of Asia
Moths of North America
Moths described in 1827
Taxa named by Jean Nicolas Vallot